The 2006 Star Dragon Woods Villa Cup China Open was a professional ranking snooker tournament that took place between 20 and 26 March 2006 at the Beijing University Students' Gymnasium in Beijing, China. It was the penultimate ranking event of the 2005–06 season, preceding the 2006 World Championship.

Mark Williams won the tournament by defeating John Higgins 9–8 in a high-quality final.


Prize fund
The breakdown of prize money for this year is shown below: 

Winner: £30,000
Runner Up: £15,000
Semi Finalist: £7,500
Quarter Finalist: £5,600
Last 16: £4,000
Last 32: £2,500
Last 48: £1,625
Last 64: £1,100

Stage one high break: £500
Stage two high break: £2,000

Stage one maximum break: £1,000
Stage two maximum break: £20,000

Wildcard round

Main draw

Final

Qualifying

Qualifying for the tournament took place at Pontin's in Prestatyn, Wales  between November 15 and November 18, 2005.

Century breaks

Qualifying stage centuries

137  Mark Selby
134  Dave Harold
130  Nick Dyson
129  Jamie Burnett
129  Mark Davis
127  Patrick Wallace
126  Jimmy Michie
124, 104  Ryan Day
122  Simon Bedford
119  Leo Fernandez
118, 107  Stuart Bingham
118  Robin Hull

116  David Gilbert
114  James Tatton
114  Judd Trump
112  Gary Wilson
109  Alfie Burden
109  Fergal O'Brien
106  Andrew Norman
104  Liang Wenbo
101  Brian Morgan
101  Scott MacKenzie
101  David Roe

Televised stage centuries

135, 119, 114  Ding Junhui
133, 116, 115  Mark Williams
131  David Roe
128, 100  John Higgins
127, 122  Ricky Walden
127  Adrian Gunnell
125  Joe Swail
124, 112  Jamie Cope

124  Shaun Murphy
123  Michael Holt
120  Graeme Dott
115  Drew Henry
107  Scott MacKenzie
107  Yang Qingtian
105  Joe Perry
101  Matthew Stevens

References

2006
China Open
China Open (Snooker)
Sports competitions in Beijing